Patkum estate was one of the princely estates of India during the period of the British Raj. It is believed that the estate was found by scion of the King Vikramaditya of Solar dynasty. During British raj it was part of Bengal presidency, composing todays Chandil, Kukru, Nimdih, Ichagarh and Kandra. Ichagarh was the capital of the state.

Etymology
The name Patkum derived from dialect of aboriginal people. The capital of the estate Ichagarh derived from icha means wish and garh. The capital named after wish of queen.

History
Patkum zamindari estate was in control of Manbhum district of British India. After independence of India, the region was transferred to Bihar jurisdiction (now Jharkhand).

References

Further reading
 

History of Jharkhand
Seraikela Kharsawan district